A middleman minority is a minority population whose main occupations link producers and consumers: traders, money-lenders, etc. A middleman minority, while possibly suffering discrimination and bullying, does not hold an "extreme subordinate" status in society. The "middleman minority" concept was developed by sociologists Hubert Blalock and Edna Bonacich starting in the 1960s but is also used by political scientists and economists. This idea was further developed by American economist Thomas Sowell.

Overview
There are numerous examples of such groups gaining eventual prosperity in their adopted country despite discrimination. Often, they will take on roles between producer and consumer, such as trading and moneylending. Famous examples such as Jews throughout Europe even at times when discrimination against them was high, Chinese throughout Southeast Asia and North America, Muslims and Parsis in India, Igbos in Nigeria, Indians in East Africa, Lebanese in West Africa, and many others.

Middleman minorities usually provide an economic benefit to communities and nations and often start new industries. However, their economic aptitude, financial success and clannishness, combined with social prejudices by other groups against businesses and moneylending, can cause resentment among the native population of a country. Middleman minorities can be victims of racist violence, terrorists, bullying, genocide, racialist policy, or other forms of repression. Other ethnic groups often accuse them of plotting conspiracies against their nation or of stealing wealth from the native population.

Examples

 American Jews
 European Jews
 Ottoman Jews
 Ottoman Greeks
 Arab Christians in the Arab world
 Armenians in the Ottoman Empire
 Armenians in Baku during the Russian Empire
 Persian Armenians in Safavid dynasty 
 Azerbaijanis during the Imperial era of Iran (16th–20th centuries)
 Azerbaijanis in the Tsardom of Russia and the Russian Empire
 Azerbaijanis in contemporary Iran
 Azerbaijanis in contemporary Russia
 Radhanite Jews
 Chinese Americans
 Japanese Americans
 Korean Americans
 Greek Americans
 Armenian Americans
 Lebanese Americans
 Indians in East Africa
 Igbos in Nigeria
 Chinese in Southeast Asia
 Parsis in India, although having prospered, have done so under active patronisation of Indian rulers and have not been discriminated against because of their race.
 Japanese in South America
 Syrians in West Africa
 Lebanese in South America
 Hadhramis
 Chinese and Vietnamese in Russia and Eastern Europe since the fall of Communism and collapse of the Soviet Union
 The majority of the 19th and early 20th centuries Middle Eastern immigrants to Brazil (Lebanese, Syrians, etc., collectively called "arabes" or "turcos", the latter term because they came from the Ottoman Empire) were peddlers, merchants and other types of non-"producers".

See also
Colonialism, particularly exploitation colonialism and plantation colonies
Dominant minority
Market-dominant minority
Minoritarianism
Model minority
Neocolonialism
World on Fire (book) 
Yuri Slezkine's book The Jewish Century (2004) discussed the concept of "Mercurian" people "specializ[ing] exclusively in providing services to the surrounding food-producing societies," which are characterized as "Apollonians"

References

Further reading
Silverman, Robert Mark. 2000. Doing Business in Minority Markets: Black and Korean Entrepreneurs in Chicago’s Ethnic Beauty Aids Industry. New York: Garland Publishing.
 
 Pál Nyíri,  Chinese in Eastern Europe and Russia: A Middleman Minority in a Transnational Era, 2007, 

Sociological terminology
Minorities
Social groups
Social inequality
Bullying
Hate crimes